Dorothea Olivia Benton Frank (September 12, 1951 – September 2, 2019) was a best-selling American novelist. Her novels, including Porch Lights and By Invitation Only, are set in South Carolina.

Biography
Dorothea Benton Frank was born and grew up on Sullivan's Island in South Carolina. She attended Bishop England High School in Charleston, and then General William Moultrie High School, from where she graduated in 1969. She went on to become a graduate of the Fashion Institute of America in Atlanta, Georgia, in 1972. She died in Manhattan of complications from myelodysplastic syndrome on September 2, 2019, at the age of 67.

Frank's writing career started because she wanted to buy the family house on Sullivan's Island after her mother died in 1993. Her husband did not want to buy it, so she said she would write a book and use the proceeds to buy the house.  She didn't manage to buy the family home, but did buy another home on Sullivan's Island with money she earned from writing.

“I went to my husband and said, ‘I want to buy Momma’s house and keep it in the family.’ Peter said, ‘How much is it?’ I said $180,000. I only needed $149,000 and he said no. I asked him why and he said, ‘If you think I’m going to spend the rest of my life sitting on a front porch listening to all your relatives tell the same stories over and over till they fall off the porch, I’m not going to do it.’ ”  Ms. Frank was livid. “I said: ‘O.K. Well, I’ve got news for you, Bubba. I’m going to write a book and I’m going to sell a million copies and I’m going to buy Momma’s house back. And you can’t come in.’ He said, ‘Let’s see you do it.’ ”

Works

Lowcountry Tales series
Sullivan's Island: A Low Country Tale, Jove Berkley Publishing Group, 1999, 
Plantation, Jove Books, 2001, 
Isle of Palms: A Lowcountry Tale, Thorndike Press, 2003, 
Shem Creek: A Lowcountry Tale, Berkley Hardcover, 2004, 
Pawleys Island: A Lowcountry Tale, Berkley Books, 2005, 
Return to Sullivan's Island (Lowcountry Tales), William Morrow, 2009, 
Lowcountry Summer, William Morrow, 2010, 
Folly Beach: A Lowcountry Tale, William Morrow, 2011 
The Hurricane Sisters, William Morrow, 2014, 
Same Beach, Next Year, William Morrow, 2017,

Novels
Full of Grace, William Morrow, 2006, 
The Land of Mango Sunsets, William Morrow, 2007, 
Bulls Island, William Morrow, 2008, 
The Christmas Pearl, William Morrow, 2008, 
Porch Lights, William Morrow, 2012, 
The Last Original Wife, William Morrow, 2013, 
All the Single Ladies, William Morrow, 2015, 
All Summer Long, William Morrow, 2016, 
By Invitation Only, William Morrow, 2018, 
Queen Bee, William Morrow, 2019,

References

External links
 Official website
 Lynn Hamilton, "Dorothea Benton Frank: Frankly speaking" (interview), BookPage, April 2007.

1951 births
People from Montclair, New Jersey
American women novelists
Novelists from New Jersey
Novelists from South Carolina
21st-century American novelists
21st-century American women writers
2019 deaths
People from Sullivan's Island, South Carolina